Aphysotes tubericollis is a species of beetle in the family Cerambycidae, the only species in the genus Aphysotes.

References

Anaglyptini